Camille Ninel (23 March 1928 – 20 May 2022) was a French professional football player and manager.

Career
Born in Fort-de-France, Martinique, Ninel played as a midfielder for Metz B, Lyon, Tarentaise, Moulins and Bressuire, also managing the latter.

References

1928 births
2022 deaths
Sportspeople from Fort-de-France
French footballers
Association football midfielders
Ligue 1 players
Ligue 2 players
FC Metz players
Olympique Lyonnais players
AS Moulins players
French football managers